Thayet Township is a township of Thayet District in the Magway Region of Burma (Myanmar). It lies on the west side of the Irrawaddy. The major town and administrative center is Thayet. Notable peaks are Mount Myinba (1688 ft.) and Mount Myinmagyi (1032 ft.).

Bounds
Thayet Township is bordered by the following townships:
 Minhla to the north,
 Sinbaungwe to the northeast,
 Aunglan (Myayde) to the east and southeast,
 Kamma to the southwest, and
 Mindon to the west.

Villages
Among the many villages and wards (village census tracts) in Thayet Township are Banbyin, Kobin, Kyaukaing, Pyaye, Ta La Bar, Talabasan, Ton, and Yebyu.

Notes

External links
 "Thayet Google Satellite Map" Maplandia

Townships of Magway Region